Winston-Salem State University (WSSU) is a historically black public university in Winston-Salem, North Carolina. It is part of the University of North Carolina.

History
Winston-Salem State University was founded as Slater Industrial Academy on September 28, 1892. It began with 25 pupils and one teacher in a one-room frame structure. By 1895 the school was recognized by the State of North Carolina and in 1899 it was chartered by the state as Slater Industrial and Slater Normal School.

In 1925, the North Carolina General Assembly renamed the school Winston-Salem Teachers College and the North Carolina State Board of Education allowed the college to award elementary teacher education degrees, making it the first black institution to provide this specialized training.

The School of Nursing was established in 1953 offering baccalaureate degrees. In 1963 the North Carolina General Assembly authorized changing the name from Winston-Salem Teachers College to Winston-Salem State College. A statute designating Winston-Salem State College as Winston-Salem State University received legislative approval in 1969. On July 1, 1972, Winston-Salem State University became one of 16 constituent institutions of the University of North Carolina.

In 2020, MacKenzie Scott donated $30 million to Winston-Salem State.  Her donation is the largest single gift in the university's history.

Academics
Winston-Salem State offers over 40 academic majors and 10 graduate degrees. The school enrolls approximately 5,200 students and employs 400 faculty and over 550 staff members.

Colleges & Departments
College of Arts, Sciences, Businesses, and Education
School of Health Sciences
Graduate and Professional Programs
University College and Lifelong Learning

Rankings
Winston-Salem State University was ranked the #7 top college in the United States by the Social Mobility Index college rankings.

Winston-Salem State has been ranked #27 by U.S. News & World Report in the Top Public Comprehensive Baccalaureate Colleges of the South category between 2001 and 2009. By 2016, the university had fallen to a ranking of #84 in the same category.

Library 
C. G. O’Kelly Library is the main academic library on the campus of Winston-Salem State University, which was originally the Slater Industrial Academy. The original library was housed in Blair Hall until 1967 when the new library was built and O’Kelly Library has gone through two additions and one renovation within the past forty years.

Campus

The campus has more than 40 buildings covering . WSSU's Diggs Gallery was recognized as one of the top African-American galleries in its region.

Student activities

Athletics
 

Winston-Salem State University is currently a member of the Central Intercollegiate Athletic Association (CIAA) in NCAA Division II. From the 2007–08 season through the 2009–10 season, the Rams competed in the NCAA's Division I Mid-Eastern Athletic Conference (MEAC), despite being a transitional member that was attempting to attain full membership within the MEAC or within NCAA Division I, in which the Rams were also scheduled to begin full membership and gain access to NCAA tournaments in 2011. However, it never occurred due to financial difficulties.

National fraternities and sororities
All of the National Pan-Hellenic Council organizations currently have active chapters at Winston-Salem State University except Delta Sigma Theta sorority, who were suspended for at least a 10-year period in April 2010.   The remaining organizations are:

Other National fraternities and sororities with registered chapters are members of the Council of Independent Greek Organizations. The current members on campus include:

Notable alumni 
 

Dr. Charlie Brady Hauser former North Carolina State Legislator General Assembly 1983-1984 and 1984–1986. The originator of CIAA 1.6 Rule Prediction Table in 1969. WSSU Education Department Chair. Challenged NC Jim Crow Bus Laws in 1945, 9 years before Rosa Parks challenge. He was part of the Freedom Riders documentary You Don't Have to Ride Jim Crow. Hauser was given a Merit Award from US Power Squadrons for charting NC Intercoastal Waterways in 1977. 
 Ted Blunt, retired elected official, educator and former athlete, served as the former president, City Council of Wilmington, Delaware
 Rajah Caruth, NASCAR driver
 Carla Cunningham, Democratic politician. She is a member of the North Carolina House of Representatives from the 106th District, being first elected in 2012
 Cleo Hill, professional basketball player who was selected by the St. Louis Hawks in the first round (8th overall) of the 1961 NBA draft. 
 Earl "The Pearl" Monroe 1964–1967, former NBA guard; member of Naismith Memorial Basketball Hall of Fame.
 Lorraine H. Morton, politician, longest-serving and first African American mayor of Evanston, Illinois.
 Timmy Newsome, former American football fullback in the National Football League for the Dallas Cowboys.
 Earline W. Parmon, Democratic Politician.
Chris Paul - considered one of the NBA's best point guards of all-time.
 Marshall L. Shepard, Baptist minister and Philadelphia City Councilman.
 Louise Smith, an educator who established the first kindergarten program in North Carolina.
 Stephen A. Smith, ESPN personality, co-star of First Take
 Yancey Thigpen, former NFL wide receiver who played for the San Diego Chargers (1991), the Pittsburgh Steelers (1992–1997), and the Tennessee Oilers/Titans (1998-2000)
 Dennis L.A. White, stage and screen actor noted for portraying Damion 'D-Roc' Butler in the Notorious B.I.G. biopic entitled Notorious and the re-occurring character "Mistah Ray" on NBC's Parenthood
 Earl "The Twirl" Williams, American-Israeli basketball player
 Donald Evans (American football), former professional American football Defensive Lineman in the National Football League for the Los Angeles Rams, Philadelphia Eagles, Pittsburgh Steelers & New York Jets
 Richard Huntley, professional American football running back in the National Football League. He played six seasons for the Atlanta Falcons (1996), the Pittsburgh Steelers (1998–2000), the Carolina Panthers (2001), and the Detroit Lions (2002). 
 Louis Farrakhan, religious leader, African-American activist, and social commentator
 Oronde Gadsden, former professional American football wide receiver in the National Football League for the Dallas Cowboys and Miami Dolphins
 Spurgeon Neal Ellington, Tuskegee Airman. 1st Lieutenant in the U.S. Army. Awarded the Distinguished Flying Cross.
 Maria Howell, actress and singer. She made her film debut in The Color Purple (1985) and appeared in Hidden Figures (2016) as Ms. Sumner.
 William Hayes, American football defensive end for the Miami Dolphins of the National Football League (NFL). He was drafted by the Tennessee Titans in the fourth round of the 2008 NFL Draft.
 Harry Lewis, member of the Pennsylvania House of Representatives, representing the 74th House district in Chester County, Pennsylvania.
 Derwin L. Montgomery, Winston-Salem City Councilman, pastor, owner of the Winston-Salem Chronicle, and a member of the North Carolina House of Representatives.
 Moyer Hauser (1896 to 1978) Professor of Physics and engineer who helped build WSSU building formally Slater Teachers College. The Hauser Building on campus was initially named for him. Moyer Hauser was the chief sound effects producer for City's Community radio workshop in the early 1940s.

References

External links

Winston-Salem State Athletics website

 
University of North Carolina
Public universities and colleges in North Carolina
Historically black universities and colleges in the United States
Universities and colleges accredited by the Southern Association of Colleges and Schools
Universities and colleges in Winston-Salem, North Carolina
1892 establishments in North Carolina